Onkarabile Ratanang (born 16 March 1998) is a Motswana professional footballer who plays as a left-back for Botswana Premier League club Township Rollers and the Botswana national team.

International career
Ratanang was given his senior debut by Adel Amrouche on an Independence Day friendly against Liberia.

Honours

Club
Township Rollers
Botswana Premier League (1): 2018-19

External links

References

1998 births
Living people
Botswana footballers
Sankoyo Bush Bucks F.C. players
Township Rollers F.C. players
Botswana international footballers
Association football fullbacks